Sender is a circuit in an electromechanical telephone exchange sending telephone numbers and other information to another exchange.

Sender may also refer to:

the return address of a postal item
the producer of a message in models of communication
The Sender, 1982 horror film

As a name, it may refer to:

Ramón J. Sender (1902–1982), Spanish novelist
Ramon Sender (born 1934), US composer, son of Ramón J. Sender
Sol Sender, US graphic designer, son of Ramon Sender
Ruth Minsky Sender (born 1926), US writer and Shoa survivor
Sender (singer), a Ukrainian singer, DJ and music producer
Sender (band), a rock band from Bendigo